Jacob Rabinowitz may refer to:

 Jacob Rabinowitz (editor), co-editor of the magazine Factsheet Five
 Jacob J. Rabinowitz, professor of law